{{Infobox writer
| name = P. Sukumar
| image = 
| imagesize = 
| caption = 
| pseudonym = 
| birth_date = 
| birth_place = Kerala, kollengode, Palakkad, India
| death_date = 
| death_place = 
| occupation = Cinematographer, Actor, Director, producer
| nationality = Indian
| period = 
| genre = 
| subject = 
| spouse = 
| children = 
| parents = 
| movement = 
| notableworks = {{ubl|Azhakiya Ravanan|Ee Puzhayum Kadannu|Krishnagudiyil Oru Pranayakalathu|Ravanaprabhu|Kalyanaraman|Kunjikkoonan|Swapnakoodu|Raappakal|Swantham Lekhakan}}
| influences = 
| influenced = 
| awards = 
| signature = 
| website = 
}}

P. Sukumar ISC is an Indian cinematographer, director, producer and actor who  works predominantly in Malayalam cinema. He is known for directing the film, Swantham Lekhakan, and handling the camera for over 65 films such as Twenty:20, Azhakiya Ravanan, Ee Puzhayum Kadannu, Ravanaprabhu, Kalyanaraman, Kunjikkoonan, Swapnakoodu and Raappakal. He has also acted, with the screen name, Kiran, in a number of films  including Chettayees and Kaikudanna Nilavu. Noted Malayalam film director, P. Chandrakumar is his elder brother. He is a recipient of the Kerala State Film Award for Best Cinematography in 1993 for the film, Sopanam (film)|Sopanam and the Kerala State Film Award for Best Debut Director for his film Swantham Lekhakan'' in 2009.

Selected filmography

See also 

 Jayanan Vincent
 Madhu Ambat

References

External links 
 
 
 

People from Kerala
Malayalam film cinematographers
Living people
Year of birth missing (living people)
Malayali people
Malayalam film directors
Malayalam film producers
Indian film actors
Male actors in Malayalam cinema
Kerala State Film Award winners
Cinematographers from Kerala